In computing, Gist is a scientific graphics library written in C by David H. Munro of Lawrence Livermore National Laboratory. It supports  three graphics output devices: X Window, PostScript, and Computer Graphics Metafiles (CGM). The library is promoted as being small (writing directly to Xlib), efficient, and full-featured. Portability is restricted to systems running X Window (essentially the Unix world).

There is a Python port called PyGist; it is used as one of several optional graphics front-ends of the scientific library SciPy. PyGist is also ported to Mac OS and Microsoft Windows.

Unix programming tools
Lawrence Livermore National Laboratory